Brazil competed at the 1960 Summer Olympics in Rome, Italy. 72 competitors, 71 men and 1 woman, took part in 35 events in 14 sports. Brazilians obtained two bronze medals in Rome. The swimmer Manuel dos Santos was a bronze medalist in men's 100 metre freestyle. The men's basketball team also won the bronze medal. Flagbearer and defending two-time Olympic champion Adhemar Ferreira da Silva could not repeat his performance and placed fourteenth in the triple jump,

Medalists

Athletics

Men
Track & road events

Field events

Women
Track & road events

Basketball

Preliminary round

Group C

Semifinals

Pool A

Championship Round

Boxing

Men

Cycling

One male cyclist represented Brazil in 1960.

Track
1000m time trial

Men's Sprint

Diving

Men

Equestrian

Show jumping

Football

First round

Group B

Modern pentathlon

Three male pentathletes represented Brazil in 1960.
Men

Rowing

Brazil had five male rowers participate in one out of seven rowing events in 1960.

Men

Sailing

Open

Shooting

Three shooters represented Brazil in 1960.
Men

Swimming

Men

Water polo

First round

Group B

Weightlifting

Men

References

External links
Official Olympic Reports
International Olympic Committee results database

Nations at the 1960 Summer Olympics
1960
Olympics